Madhan may refer to:

People
Madhan (writer) (born 1947), Indian writer
Madhan Bob (born 1950), Indian comedian
Madhan Karky (born 1980), Indian lyricist, software engineer, and film dialogue writer
Preet Kaur Madhan, Indian television actress

Places
Madhan, Iranshahr, a village in Iran

See also
Madan (disambiguation)